The 2007 Ordina Open was the 2007 edition of the Ordina Open tennis tournament. It was the 18th edition of the tournament and was played on outdoor grass courts. The men's and women's tournament was held from 18 through 25 June 2007.

Ivan Ljubičić won his first grass title. Anna Chakvetadze won her second of four titles she would win in the year.

Finals

Men's singles

 Ivan Ljubičić defeated  Peter Wessels, 7–6(7–5), 4–6, 7–6(7–4)

Women's singles

 Anna Chakvetadze defeated  Jelena Janković, 7–6(7–2), 3–6, 6–3

Men's doubles

 Jeff Coetzee /  Rogier Wassen defeated  Martin Damm /  Leander Paes, 3–6, 7–6(7–5), [12–10]

Women's doubles

 Chan Yung-Jan /  Chuang Chia-Jung defeated  Anabel Medina Garrigues /  Virginia Ruano Pascual, 7–5, 6–2

External links
 
 Men's Singles draw
 Women's Singles draw
 Men's Doubles draw
 Women's Doubles draw

Ordina Open
Ordina Open
Rosmalen Grass Court Championships
Ordina Open, 2007